Bodza is a village and municipality in the Komárno District in the Nitra Region of south-west Slovakia.

Geography
The village lies at an altitude of 109 metres and covers an area of 6.318 km².
It had a population of about 355 people as at 31 December 2004.

History
In the 9th century, the territory of Bodza became part of the Kingdom of Hungary. In historical records the village was first mentioned in 1245.
After the Austro-Hungarian army disintegrated in November 1918, Czechoslovak troops occupied the area, later acknowledged internationally by the Treaty of Trianon. Between 1938 and 1945 Bodza once more became part of Miklós Horthy's Hungary through the First Vienna Award. From 1945 until the Velvet Divorce, it was part of Czechoslovakia. Since then it has been part of Slovakia.

Facilities
The village has a  football pitch.

Genealogical resources

The records for genealogical research are available at the state archive "Statny Archiv in Bratislava, Nitra, Slovakia"

 Roman Catholic church records (births/marriages/deaths): 1750-1939 (parish B)
 Reformated church records (births/marriages/deaths): 1783-1918 (parish B)

See also
 List of municipalities and towns in Slovakia

References

External links
Surnames of living people in Bodza

Villages and municipalities in the Komárno District
Hungarian communities in Slovakia